Mohamed Manaâ (born 21 November 1964) is an Algerian footballer. He played in one match for the Algeria national football team in 1989. He was also named in Algeria's squad for the 1990 African Cup of Nations tournament.

References

External links
 

1964 births
Living people
Algerian footballers
Algeria international footballers
1990 African Cup of Nations players
Africa Cup of Nations-winning players
Place of birth missing (living people)
Association footballers not categorized by position
21st-century Algerian people